Øystein Grødum (born 15 February 1977) is a Norwegian speedskater, who is a member of Arendal SK. Grødum competed in the 2006 Winter Olympics for Norway, with fourth place on 10,000 metres as his best place, and won the World Cup on long distances in 2004–05. However, he is yet to win an overall championship medal, though he won two distance golds in the 2005 World Allround Championship and a distance gold at the European Championship the same year.

Personal bests

As of December 2006, these are

References

  Nettavisen - Torino 2006 - Øystein Grødum, from Nettavisen, retrieved 26 June 2006

External links 
 Photos of Øystein Grødum at Speedskatingphotos by Biseth
 Øystein Grødum at SkateResults.com
 Grødum's home page
 Photos of Øystein Grødum

Further references and notes 

1977 births
Living people
Norwegian male speed skaters
Speed skaters at the 2006 Winter Olympics
Olympic speed skaters of Norway
People from Arendal
Sportspeople from Agder